The Crown Jewels of the United Kingdom, originally the Crown Jewels of England, are a collection of royal ceremonial objects kept in the Tower of London, which include the coronation regalia and vestments worn by British monarchs.

Symbols of over 800 years of monarchy, the coronation regalia are the only working set in Europe and the collection is the most historically complete of any regalia in the world. Objects used to invest and crown British monarchs variously denote their role as head of state of the United Kingdom and other countries of the Commonwealth, Supreme Governor of the Church of England, and head of the British armed forces. They feature heraldic devices and national emblems of England, Scotland, Wales, and Northern Ireland.

Use of regalia by monarchs in England can be traced back to when it was converted to Christianity in the Early Middle Ages.  A permanent set of coronation regalia, once belonging to Edward the Confessor, was established after he was made a saint in the 12th century. These holy relics were kept at Westminster Abbey, the venue of coronations since 1066, and another set of regalia was reserved for religious feasts and State Openings of Parliament. Collectively, these objects came to be known as the Jewels of the Crown. Most of the present collection dates from around 350 years ago when Charles II ascended the throne. The medieval and Tudor regalia had been sold or melted down after the monarchy was abolished in 1649 during the English Civil War. Only four original items predate the Restoration: a late 12th-century anointing spoon (the oldest object) and three early 17th-century swords. The regalia continued to be used by British monarchs after the kingdoms of England and Scotland merged in 1707.

The regalia contain 23,578 gemstones, among them Cullinan I, the largest clear cut diamond in the world, set in the Sovereign's Sceptre with Cross. It was cut from the largest gem-quality rough diamond ever found, the eponymous Cullinan, discovered in South Africa in 1905 and presented to Edward VII. On the Imperial State Crown are Cullinan II, the Stuart Sapphire, St Edward's Sapphire, and the Black Prince's Ruby – a large red spinel. The Koh-i-Noor diamond was acquired by Queen Victoria from India and has featured on three consort crowns. A small number of historical objects at the Tower are either empty or set with glass and crystal replicas.

At a coronation, the monarch is anointed using holy oil poured from an ampulla into the spoon, invested with robes and ornaments, and crowned with St Edward's Crown. Afterwards, it is exchanged for the lighter Imperial State Crown, which is also usually worn at State Openings of Parliament. Wives of kings, known as queens consort, are invested with a plainer set of regalia. Also regarded as crown jewels are state swords, trumpets, ceremonial maces, church plate, historical regalia, banqueting plate, and royal christening fonts. They are part of the Royal Collection and belong to the institution of monarchy, passing from one sovereign to the next. When not in use the Jewels are on public display in the Jewel House where they are seen by 2.5 million visitors every year.

History

Prehistory and Romans
The earliest known use of a crown in Britain was discovered by archaeologists in 1988 in Deal, Kent, and dates to between 200 and 150 BCE. A sword, brooch, ceremonial shield, and decorated bronze crown with a single arch, which sat directly on the head of its wearer, were found inside the tomb of the Mill Hill Warrior. At this point, crowns were symbols of authority worn by religious and military leaders. Priests continued to use crowns following the Roman conquest of Britain in 43 CE. A dig in a field at Hockwold cum Wilton, Norfolk, in the 1950s revealed a bronze crown with two arches and depictions of male faces, as well as two bronze diadems with an adjustable headband and repoussé silver embellishments, dating from the Roman period. One diadem features a plaque in the centre depicting a man holding a sphere and an object similar to a shepherd's crook, analogues of the orb and sceptre that evolved later as royal ornaments.

Anglo-Saxons

By the early 5th century, the Romans had withdrawn from Britain, and the Angles and the Saxons settled. A heptarchy of new kingdoms began to emerge. One method used by regional kings to solidify their authority was the use of ceremony and insignia. The tomb of an unknown king – evidence suggests it may be Rædwald of East Anglia – at Sutton Hoo provides insight into the regalia of a pre-Christian Anglo-Saxon monarch. Inside the early 7th-century tomb, discovered in 1939, was found the ornate Sutton Hoo helmet, consisting of an iron cap, a neck guard, and a face mask decorated with copper alloy images of animals and warriors set with garnets. He was also buried with a decorated sword; a ceremonial shield; and a heavy whetstone sceptre, on top of which is an iron ring surmounted by the figure of a stag.

In 597 CE, a Benedictine monk was sent by Pope Gregory I to start converting Pagan England to Christianity. The monk, Augustine, became the first Archbishop of Canterbury. Within two centuries, the ritual of anointing monarchs with holy oil and crowning them (initially with helmets) in a Christian ceremony had been established, and regalia took on a religious identity. There was still no permanent set of coronation regalia; each monarch generally had a new set made, with which they were buried upon death. In 9th-century Europe, gold crowns in the Byzantine tradition were replacing bronze, and gold soon became the standard material for English royal crowns.

King Æthelstan united the various Anglo-Saxon realms to form the Kingdom of England. In the earliest known depiction of an English king wearing a crown he is shown presenting a copy of Bede's Life of St Cuthbert to the saint himself. Until his reign, kings were portrayed on coins wearing helmets and circlets, or wreath-like diadems in the style of Roman emperor Constantine the Great. Whether they actually wore such an item is not known. Edgar the Peaceful was the first English king to be crowned with an actual crown, and a sceptre was also introduced for his coronation. After crowns, sceptres were the most potent symbols of royal authority in medieval England.

Edward the Confessor
Edward the Confessor  is depicted on a throne and wearing a crown and holding a sceptre in the first scene of the Bayeux Tapestry. Edward died without an heir, and William the Conqueror emerged as the first Norman king of England following his victory over the English at the Battle of Hastings. Wearing a crown became an important part of William I's efforts to assert authority over his new territory and subjects. At his death in 1087, the Anglo-Saxon Chronicle reported: "[William] kept great state … He wore his crown three times a year as often as he was in England … He was so stern and relentless … we must not forget the good order he kept in the land". Those crown-wearings were held on the religious festivals of Easter, Whitsun, and Christmas.

In 1161, Edward the Confessor was made a saint, and objects connected with his reign became holy relics. The monks at his burial place of Westminster Abbey claimed that Edward had asked them to look after his regalia in perpetuity and that they were to be used at the coronations of all future kings. A note to this effect is contained in an inventory of precious relics drawn up by a monk at the abbey in 1450, recording a tunicle, dalmatic, pallium, and other vestments; a gold sceptre, two rods, a gold crown, comb, and spoon; a crown and two rods for the queen's coronation; and a chalice of onyx stone and a paten made of gold for the Holy Communion. Although the Abbey's claim is likely to have been an exercise in self-promotion, and some of the regalia had probably been taken from Edward's grave when he was reinterred there, it became accepted as fact, thereby establishing the first known set of hereditary coronation regalia in Europe. Westminster Abbey is owned by a monarch, and the regalia had always been royal property – the abbots were mere custodians. In the following centuries, some of these objects would fall out of use and the regalia would expand to include many others used or worn by monarchs and queens consort at coronations.

A crown referred to as "St Edward's Crown" is first recorded as having been used for the coronation of Henry III and appears to be the same crown worn by Edward. Being crowned and invested with regalia owned by a previous monarch who was also a saint reinforced the king's authority. It was also wrongly thought to have been originally owned by Alfred the Great because an inscription on the lid of its box, translated from Latin, read: "This is the chief crown of the two, with which were crowned Kings Alfred, Edward and others". The crown would be used in many subsequent coronations until its eventual destruction 400 years later. Few descriptions survive, although one 17th century historian noted that it was "ancient Work with Flowers, adorn'd with Stones of somewhat a plain setting", and an inventory described it as "gold wire-work set with slight stones and two little bells", weighing . It had arches and may have been decorated with filigree and cloisonné enamels. Also in the Royal Collection in this period was an item called a state crown. Together with other crowns, rings, and swords, it constituted the monarch's state regalia that were kept separate from the coronation regalia, mostly at the royal palaces.

Late medieval period

The handing over of crowns symbolised the transfer of power between rulers. Following the defeat in 1282 of the Welsh prince Llewelyn ap Gruffydd by Edward I, the Welsh regalia, including the crown of the legendary King Arthur, were surrendered to England. According to the Chronicle of Aberconwy Abbey, "and so the glory of Wales and the Welsh was handed over to the kings of England". After the invasion of Scotland in 1296, the Stone of Scone was sent to the Tower of London "in recognition of a kingdom surrendered and conquered". It was fitted into a wooden chair, which came to be used for the investiture of English kings, now known as the Coronation Chair. The Scottish regalia were also taken to London and offered at the shrine of Edward the Confessor; Scotland eventually regained its independence. In the treasury of Edward II there were no fewer than 10 crowns. When Richard II was forced to abdicate, he symbolically handed St Edward's Crown over to his successor with the words "I present and give to you this crown … and all the rights dependent on it".

Monarchs often pledged items of state regalia as collateral for loans. Edward III pawned his magna corona to Baldwin of Luxembourg in 1339 for more than £16,650, equal to £ . Three crowns and other jewels were held by the Bishop of London and the Earl of Arundel in the 1370s as security for £10,000. One crown was exchanged with the Corporation of London in 1386 for a £4,000 loan. Mayors, knights, peers, bankers, and other wealthy subjects sometimes released objects on a temporary basis for the royal family to use at state occasions. Monarchs also distributed plate and jewels to troops in lieu of money. At some point in the 14th century, all of the state regalia were moved to the White Tower at the Tower of London owing to a series of successful and attempted thefts in Westminster Abbey. The holy relics of the coronation regalia stayed behind intact at the Abbey.

Having fallen out of use in England in the 13th century, two arches topped with a monde and cross reappeared on the state crown during the reign of Henry V, though arches did not feature on the Great Seal again until 1471. Known as a 'closed' or imperial crown, the arches and cross symbolised the king's pretensions of being an emperor of his own domain, subservient to no one but God, unlike some continental rulers who owed fealty to more powerful kings or to the Holy Roman Emperor.

Tudors and early Stuarts
The traditions established in the medieval period continued later. By the mid 15th century, a crown was formally worn on six religious feasts every year: Christmas, Epiphany, Easter, Whitsun, All Saints' Day, and one or both feasts of St Edward. A crown was displayed and worn at the annual State Opening of Parliament. Also around this time, three swords – symbols of kingship since ancient times – were being used in the coronation ceremony to represent the king's powers in the administration of justice: the Sword of Spiritual Justice, the Sword of Temporal Justice, and the blunt Sword of Mercy.

An emerging item of regalia was the orb, described in Tudor inventories as a gold ball with a cross, which underlined the monarch's sovereignty. Orbs had been pictorial emblems of royal authority in England since the early Middle Ages, but a real orb was probably not used at any English coronation until Henry VIII. State regalia increasingly passed from one monarch to the next. The best example of this was the imperial state Tudor Crown, which was probably created at the beginning of the Tudor dynasty. It first appears in a royal inventory during Henry VIII's reign and was one of three used to crown each of his next three successors, the others being St Edward's Crown and a personal crown. After the English Reformation, when England broke away from the authority of the Roman Catholic Church, the Church of England denounced the veneration of medieval relics and downplayed the history of St Edward's regalia.

The concept of hereditary state regalia was enshrined in English law in 1606 when James I, the first Stuart king to rule England, decreed a list of "Roiall and Princely ornaments and Jewells to be indyvidually and inseparably for ever hereafter annexed to the Kingdome of this Realme". After James died, his son, Charles I ascended the throne. Desperate for money, one of his first acts was to load 41 masterpieces from the Jewel House onto a ship bound for Amsterdam – the hub of Europe's jewel trade. This hoard of unique treasures, including the Mirror of Great Britain brooch, a 14th-century pendant called the Three Brothers, a  gold salt cellar known as the Morris Dance, and much fine Elizabethan plate, was expected to swell the king's coffers by £300,000, but fetched only £70,000.

Charles's many conflicts with Parliament, stemming from his belief in the divine right of kings and the many religious conflicts that pervaded his reign, triggered the English Civil War in 1642. Parliament deemed the regalia as "Jewels of the Crown": their ownership was vested in the monarch by virtue of his public role as king and not owned by him personally. To avoid putting his subjects at legal risk, Charles asked his wife Henrietta Maria to smuggle the inalienable property of the Crown abroad and sell it on the Dutch jewellery market. Upon learning of the scheme, the House of Lords and House of Commons both declared anyone involved in trafficking the Crown Jewels to be an enemy of the state. Henrietta succeeded in disposing of a small quantity of jewels, albeit at a heavy discount, and shipped guns and ammunition back to England for the royalist cause. Two years later, Parliament seized  of rare silver-gilt pieces from the Jewel House and used the proceeds to bankroll its own side of the war.

Interregnum

After six years of war, Charles was defeated and executed, and less than a week later, the Rump Parliament voted to abolish the monarchy. The newly created English Commonwealth found itself short of money. To raise funds, the Act for the Sale of the Goods and Personal Estate of the Late King, Queen and Prince was brought into law, and trustees were appointed to value the Jewels – then regarded by Oliver Cromwell as "symbolic of the detestable rule of kings" and "monuments of superstition and idolatry"  – and sell them to the highest bidder. The most valuable object was Henry VIII's Crown, valued at £1,100. Their gemstones and pearls removed, most of the coronation and state regalia were melted down, and the gold was struck into coins by the Mint.

Two nuptial crowns survived: the Crown of Margaret of York and the Crown of Princess Blanche had been taken out of England centuries before the Civil War when Margaret and Blanche married kings in continental Europe. Both crowns and the 9th-century Alfred Jewel give a sense of the character of royal jewellery in England in the Middle Ages. Another rare survivor is the 600-year-old Crystal Sceptre, a gift from Henry V to the Lord Mayor of London, who still bears it at coronations. Many pieces of English plate that were presented to visiting dignitaries can be seen in museums throughout Europe. Cromwell declined Parliament's invitations to be made king and became Lord Protector. It was marked by a ceremony in Westminster Hall in 1657, where he donned purple robes, sat on the Coronation Chair, and was invested with many traditional symbols of sovereignty, except a crown. A crown—perhaps made of gilded base metal, which was typical of funerary crowns in those days—was placed beside Cromwell at his lying in state in 1660.

Restoration to present day
The monarchy was restored after Cromwell's death. For the English coronation of Charles II, who had been living in exile abroad, new Jewels were made based on records of the lost items. They were supplied by the banker and royal goldsmith, Sir Robert Vyner, at a cost of £12,184 7s 2d – as much as three warships. It was decided to fashion the replicas like the medieval regalia and to use the original names. These 22-carat gold objects, made in 1660 and 1661, form the nucleus of today's Crown Jewels: St Edward's Crown, two sceptres, an orb, an ampulla, a pair of spurs, a pair of armills or bracelets, and a staff. A medieval silver-gilt anointing spoon and three early Stuart swords had survived and were returned to the Crown, and the Dutch ambassador arranged the return of extant jewels pawned in Holland. The king also spent £11,800 acquiring  of altar and banqueting plate, and he was presented with conciliatory gifts.

In 1669, the Jewels went on public display for the first time in the Jewel House at the Tower of London. The Deputy Keeper of the Jewel House took the regalia out of a cupboard and showed it to visitors for a small fee. This informal arrangement was ended two years later when Thomas Blood, an Irish-born army officer loyal to Parliament, attacked the 77-year-old and stole a crown, a sceptre, and an orb. Blood and his three accomplices were apprehended at the castle perimeter, but the crown had been flattened with a mallet in an attempt to conceal it, and there was a dent in the orb. He was pardoned by the king, who also gave him land and a pension; it has been suggested that Blood was treated leniently because he was a government spy. Ever since, the Jewels have been protected by armed guards.

Since the Restoration, there have been many additions and alterations to the regalia. A new set was commissioned in 1685 for Mary of Modena, the first queen consort to be crowned since the Restoration (Charles II was unmarried when he took the throne). Another, more elaborate set had to be made for Mary II, who was crowned as joint sovereign with her husband William III. After England and Scotland were united as one kingdom by the Acts of Union 1707, the Scottish regalia were locked away in a chest, and the English regalia continued to be used by British monarchs. Gemstones were hired for coronations – the fee typically being 4% of their value – and replaced with glass and crystals for display in the Jewel House, a practice that continued until the early 20th century.

As enemy planes targeted London during the Second World War, the Crown Jewels were secretly moved to Windsor Castle. The most valuable gemstones were taken out of their settings by James Mann, Master of the Armouries, and Sir Owen Morshead, the Royal Librarian. They were wrapped in cotton wool, placed in a tall glass preserving-jar, which was then sealed in a biscuit tin, and hidden in the castle's basement. Also placed in the jar was a note from the King, stating that he had personally directed that the gemstones be removed from their settings. As the Crown Jewels were bulky and thus difficult to transport without a vehicle, the idea was that if the Nazis invaded, the historic precious stones could easily be carried on someone's person without drawing suspicion and if necessary buried or sunk.

After the war, the Jewels were kept in a vault at the Bank of England for two years while the Jewel House was repaired; the Tower had been struck by a bomb. In 1953, St Edward's Crown was placed on the head of Elizabeth II in what is now the only ceremony of its kind in Europe. Other European monarchies have abandoned coronations in favour of secular ceremonies. Today, 142 objects make up the Crown Jewels, which are permanently set with 23,578 precious and semi-precious stones and are seen by around 2.5 million visitors every year.

Crowns
Crowns are the main symbols of royal authority. All crowns in the Tower are decorated with alternating crosses pattée and fleurs-de-lis, a pattern which first appears on the great seal of Richard III, and their arches are surmounted with a monde and cross pattée. Most of the crowns also have a red or purple velvet cap and an ermine border.

St Edward's Crown
The centrepiece of the coronation regalia is named after Edward the Confessor and is placed on the monarch's head at the moment of crowning. Made of gold and completed in 1661, St Edward's Crown is embellished with 444 stones, including amethysts, garnets, peridots, rubies, sapphires, topazes, tourmalines and zircons. The coronation crown closely resembles the medieval one, with a heavy gold base and clusters of semi-precious stones, but the disproportionately large arches are a Baroque affectation. It was long assumed to be the original as their weight is almost identical and an invoice produced in 1661 was for the addition of gold to an existing crown. In 2008, new research found that it had actually been made in 1660 and was enhanced the following year when Parliament increased the budget for Charles II's twice-delayed coronation. After 1689, monarchs chose to be crowned with a lighter, bespoke coronation crown (e.g., that of George IV) or their state crown, while St Edward's Crown rested on the high altar. At Queen Victoria's coronation in 1838 it was entirely absent from the ceremony. The tradition of using St Edward's Crown was revived in 1911 by George V and has continued ever since. In 1953 Elizabeth II opted for a stylised image of this crown to be used on coats of arms, badges, logos and various other insignia in the Commonwealth realms to symbolise her royal authority, replacing the image of a Tudor-style crown adopted in 1901 by Edward VII.

Imperial State Crown

A much lighter crown is worn by the monarch when leaving Westminster Abbey, and at the annual State Opening of Parliament. The gold, silver and platinum crown is decorated with 2,868 diamonds, 273 pearls, 17 sapphires, 11 emeralds and 5 rubies. Among the largest stones are the  Cullinan II diamond, also known as the Second Star of Africa, added to the crown in 1909 (the larger Cullinan I is set in the Sovereign's Sceptre). The  Black Prince's Ruby, set in the front cross, is not actually a ruby but a large cabochon red spinel. According to legend it was given to Edward the Black Prince by the Spanish king Peter of Castile in 1367 and Henry V wore it at the Battle of Agincourt. How the stone found its way back into the Royal Collection after the Interregnum is unclear, but a substantial "ruby" was acquired for the Crown Jewels in 1661 at a cost of £400, and this may well have been the spinel. On the back of the crown is the  cabochon Stuart Sapphire, and in the top cross is St Edward's Sapphire, reputedly taken from the ring of the Confessor when his body was re-interred at the Abbey in 1163. Below the monde hang four pearls, three of which are often said to have belonged to Elizabeth I, but the association is almost certainly erroneous.

Consort crowns
After the Restoration, wives of kings – queens consort – traditionally wore the State Crown of Mary of Modena, wife of James II, who first wore it at their coronation in 1685. Originally set with 561 hired diamonds and 129 pearls, it is now set with crystals and cultured pearls for display in the Jewel House along with a matching diadem that consorts wore in procession to the Abbey. The diadem once held 177 diamonds, 1 ruby, 1 sapphire, and 1 emerald. By the 19th century, that crown was judged to be too theatrical and in a poor state of repair, so in 1831 the Crown of Queen Adelaide was made for Queen Adelaide, wife of William IV, using gemstones from her private jewellery.

Thus began a tradition of each queen consort having a crown made specially for their use. In 1902 the Crown of Queen Alexandra, a European-style crown – flatter and with eight half-arches instead of the typical four – was made for Queen Alexandra, wife of Edward VII, to wear at their coronation. Set with over 3,000 diamonds, it was the first consort crown to include the Koh-i-Noor diamond presented to Queen Victoria in 1850 following the British conquest of the Punjab. Originally  and set in an armlet, it was cut down to an oval brilliant weighing , which Victoria mounted in a brooch and circlet. The second was the Crown of Queen Mary; also unusual for a British crown owing to its eight half-arches, it was made in 1911 for Queen Mary, wife of George V. Mary purchased the Art Deco-inspired crown with her own money hoping it would become an heirloom used by future queens consort. Altogether, it is adorned with 2,200 diamonds, and once contained the  Cullinan III and  Cullinan IV diamonds. Its arches were made detachable in 1914 allowing it to be worn as an open crown or circlet.

After George V's death, Mary continued wearing the crown (without its arches) as a queen mother, so the Crown of Queen Elizabeth was created for Queen Elizabeth, wife of George VI, and later known as the Queen Mother, to wear at their coronation in 1937. It is the only British crown made entirely out of platinum, and was modelled on Queen Mary's Crown, but has four half-arches instead of eight. The crown is decorated with about 2,800 diamonds, most notably the Koh-i-Noor in the middle of the front cross. It also contains a replica of the  Lahore Diamond given to Queen Victoria by the East India Company in 1851, and a  diamond given to her by Abdülmecid I, Sultan of the Ottoman Empire, in 1856. The crown was laid on top of the Queen Mother's coffin in 2002 during her lying in state and funeral. The crowns of Queen Alexandra and Queen Mary now feature crystal replicas of the Koh-i-Noor, which has been the subject of repeated controversy, with governments of both India and Pakistan claiming to be the diamond's rightful owners and demanding its return ever since gaining independence from the UK.

In February 2023, it was officially announced that Queen Camilla would be crowned using Queen Mary's Crown at her coronation with Charles III on 6 May 2023. Planned alterations include re-setting the crown with the original Cullinan diamonds, and removing four of its eight half-arches.

Prince of Wales coronets

A relatively modest gold coronet was made in 1728 for Frederick, Prince of Wales, the eldest son of George II. It takes the form laid down in a royal warrant issued by Charles II in 1677, which states "the Son & Heir apparent of the Crown for the time being shall use & bear his coronett composed of crosses & flowers de Lizs with one Arch & in the midst a Ball & Cross". The single arch denotes inferiority to the monarch while showing that the prince outranks other royal children, whose coronets have no arches. Frederick never wore his coronet; instead, it was placed on a cushion in front of him when he first took his seat in the House of Lords. It was subsequently used by George III, George IV, and Edward VII when they were Princes of Wales. Due to its age, a new silver-gilt coronet was made for the future George V to wear at Edward VII's coronation in 1902. In contrast to the earlier coronet, which has a depressed arch, the arch on this one is raised. At George's coronation in 1911 the coronet was worn by his elder son Edward, who was invested as Prince of Wales at Caernarfon Castle a month later. The revival of this public ceremony, not performed since the early 17th century, was intended to boost the Royal family's profile in Wales. Princely regalia known as the Honours of Wales were designed for the occasion by Goscombe John, comprising a Welsh gold circlet with pearls, amethysts and engraved daffodils; a rod; a ring; a sword; and a robe with doublet and sash. After he became king in 1936, Edward VIII abdicated the same year and emigrated to France, where the 1902 coronet remained in his possession until his death in 1972. In its absence, a new coronet had to be created in 1969 for the investiture of the future Charles III, which is made from gold and platinum and is set with diamonds and emeralds. Both it and the rod were added to the Jewel House in 2020, joining the 1728 and 1902 coronets.

Non-coronation crowns
In the Jewel House there are two crowns that were never intended to be worn at a coronation. She often wore it at State Openings of Parliament in place of the much heavier Imperial State Crown. After the queen's death in 1901 the crown passed to her daughter-in-law Queen Alexandra and later Queen Mary. When George V attended the Delhi Durbar with Queen Mary in 1911 to be proclaimed (but not crowned) as Emperor of India, he wore the Imperial Crown of India. As the British constitution forbids coronation regalia to leave the United Kingdom, it was not possible for him to wear St Edward's Crown or the Imperial State Crown, so one had to be made specially for the event. It contains  6,170 diamonds, 9 emeralds, 4 rubies and 4 sapphires. The crown has not been used since and is now considered a part of the Crown Jewels.

Processional objects
A coronation begins with the procession into Westminster Abbey.

Swords

The swords of state reflect a monarch's role as Head of the British Armed Forces and Defender of the Faith. Three are carried before the monarch into the Abbey: the blunt Sword of Mercy (also known as Curtana), the Sword of Spiritual Justice, and the Sword of Temporal Justice. All are believed to have been supplied at the time of James I between 1610 and 1620, probably by a member of the Worshipful Company of Cutlers, using blades created in the 1580s by Italian bladesmiths Giandonato and Andrea Ferrara. They were deposited with St Edward's regalia at the Abbey by Charles II. Before that point, new swords had been made for each coronation since the 15th century. Sold in the civil war, they were returned at the Restoration, and their use was first recorded at the coronation of James II in 1685.

The two-handed Sword of State, made in 1678 symbolises the monarch's authority and is also carried before the monarch at State Openings of Parliament. Its wooden sheath, made in 1689, is bound in crimson velvet decorated with silver-gilt emblems of England, Scotland and Ireland, fleurs-de-lis, and portcullises. The lion of England and unicorn of Scotland form the cross-piece to the sword's handle. Before the investiture, it is exchanged for the principal Sword of Offering, of which the Sword of State is a metaphor. Commissioned by George IV for his 1821 coronation, its gilded leather sheath is encrusted with 1,251 diamonds, 16 rubies, 2 sapphires and 2 turquoises. The sword has a Damascus steel blade and its handle is set with 2,141 diamonds, 12 emeralds and 4 rubies. The stones are arranged to form roses, thistles, shamrocks, oak leaves and acorns. Two diamond lion heads, one at each end of the cross-piece, have ruby eyes. George paid more than £5,000 for the sword out of his own pocket in a radical change from the austere £2 swords used by his 18th-century predecessors. It remained in personal ownership of the Royal family until 1903 when it was deposited with the Crown Jewels and has been used at every coronation since 1911. A monarch is girded and blessed using the sword, which is returned to the Keeper of the Jewel House by the Abbey for a token sum of £5, and is borne unsheathed for the rest of the ceremony.

The 17th-century Irish Sword of State was held by the Lord Lieutenant of Ireland (a viceroy) prior to Ireland's independence from the UK in 1922 and has been displayed in the Jewel House since 1959. The handle takes the form of a lion and a unicorn and is decorated with a celtic harp. Each new viceroy was invested with the sword at Dublin Castle where it usually sat across the arms of a throne, representing the king or queen in their absence. It was borne in procession in front of monarchs during their official visits to Dublin. In June 1921 the sword was present at the official opening of the Parliament of Northern Ireland by George V. The sword was displayed at Dublin Castle in 2018 as part of the 'Making Majesty' exhibition – the first time it had been to Ireland in 95 years.

St Edward's Staff
St Edward's Staff is a  ceremonial gold walking stick made for Charles II in 1661. It has a plain monde and cross at the top and a steel pike at the bottom. This object is almost certainly a copy of the long rod mentioned in the list of royal plate and jewels destroyed in 1649, although the pre-Interregnum version was gold and silver and topped by a dove. The staff's intended role in the coronation has been forgotten since medieval times, and so it is carried into the Abbey by a peer as a holy relic and laid on the altar, where it remains throughout the ceremony.

Trumpets

The Crown Jewels include 16 silver trumpets dating from between 1780 and 1848. Nine are draped with red silk damask banners embroidered with coats of arms in gold, originally made for Queen Victoria's coronation in 1838. They have not been used since the Corps of State Trumpeters was disbanded as a cost-cutting measure in the 19th century. The trumpeters' main job was to sound a fanfare at key points in the coronation, and they also played at the banquet afterwards in Westminster Hall. Today, the Band of the Household Cavalry and the Central Band of the Royal Air Force play their own trumpets at state occasions.

Maces

Beginning as lethal weapons of medieval knights, maces evolved into ceremonial objects carried by sergeants-at-arms and now represent a monarch's authority. The House of Commons can only operate lawfully when the royal mace – dating from Charles II's reign – is present at the table. Two other maces dating from the reigns of Charles II and William III are used by the House of Lords, one of which is placed on the Woolsack before the house meets and is absent when a monarch is there in person delivering the King's or Queen's Speech. In the late 17th century there were 16 maces, but only 13 survive, 10 of which are on display at the Tower of London. Two of these are carried in the royal procession at State Openings of Parliament and coronations. They are silver-gilt and were made between 1660 and 1695.

Anointing objects
When a monarch is anointed, the Dean of Westminster first pours holy anointing oil from an ampulla into a spoon.

Ampulla

Its head unscrews, enabling the vessel to be filled with oil, which exits via a hole in the beak. The original ampulla was a small stone phial, sometimes worn around the neck as a pendant by kings, and otherwise kept inside an eagle-shaped golden reliquary. According to 14th-century legend, the Virgin Mary appeared to Thomas Becket, Archbishop of Canterbury from 1162 until 1170, and presented him with a gold eagle and some oil for anointing English kings. This ampulla was first recorded as being used at Henry IV's coronation in 1399 and was deposited for safekeeping with St Edward's regalia at the Abbey by Richard III in 1483. Known as the Holy Oil of St Thomas, the same batch was used to anoint all subsequent kings and queens (except Mary I) until it eventually ran out in 1625. It is unclear why, after the Restoration, the vessel itself came to be reinterpreted as an eagle standing on a domed base. In terms of religious importance, the anointing objects are second only to St Edward's Crown, and in 2013 the ampulla stood beside the crown on the altar of Westminster Abbey at a service marking the 60th anniversary of Elizabeth II's coronation.

Spoon
The  Coronation Spoon, which dates from the late 12th century, is silver-gilt and set with four pearls added in the 17th century. A ridge divides the bowl in half, creating grooves into which the Archbishop of Canterbury dips two fingers and anoints the monarch as Supreme Governor of the Church of England. Originally, it may have been used for mixing water and wine in a chalice. The spoon is first known to have been used to anoint a monarch at the English coronation of James I in 1603. It is the oldest surviving piece of the Crown Jewels (and the only surviving English royal goldsmith's work from the 1100s), first recorded in the Royal Collection in 1349 as "a spoon of ancient form", and was probably made for Henry II or Richard I. In 1649 the spoon was sold for 16 shillings to Clement Kynnersley, Yeoman of the Removing Wardrobe, who returned it to Charles II upon the restoration of the monarchy.

Robes and ornaments
The anointing is followed by investing with coronations robes and ornaments.

Robes

All the robes have priestly connotations and their form has changed little since the Middle Ages. A tradition of wearing St Edward's robes came to an end in 1547 after the English Reformation, but was revived in 1603 by James I to emphasise his belief in the divine nature of kingship. As well as robes, a monarch also wore cloth-of-gold buskins or sandals, depending on his or her foot size. These holy relics were destroyed along with royal crowns and ornaments in the Civil War. New robes were made for each monarch starting with Charles II, a practice that ended in 1911, when George V wore the Supertunica (a dalmatic), and the Imperial Mantle (a cope), both fashioned for George IV in 1821. They were also worn by his successors George VI and Elizabeth II. A new stole was made in 1953 for Elizabeth II by the Worshipful Company of Girdlers. It is adorned with floral emblems of Australia, Canada, Ceylon, India, New Zealand, and the four countries of the United Kingdom – members of the Commonwealth, which was headed by the Queen.

Spurs
Prick spurs remade for Charles II are presented to the monarch. They are made of solid gold, richly embossed with floral patterns and scrolls, and have crimson velvet straps embroidered in gold. Both necks terminate in a Tudor rose with a spike at its centre. Also known as St George's Spurs, they are emblems of knighthood and chivalry, and denote the sovereign's role as head of the armed forces. Gold spurs are first known to have been used in 1189 at the coronation of Richard I, though it is likely they were introduced for Henry the Young King in 1170, and this element of the service was probably inspired by the initiation ceremony of knights. A pair of mid 14th-century spurs were added to St Edward's regalia at the Abbey in 1399 and used at all coronations until their destruction in 1649. Historically, spurs were fastened to a monarch's feet, but since the Restoration they are simply brushed against the heels of kings or shown to queens.

Armills
The Armills are gold bracelets of sincerity and wisdom. Like spurs, they were first used at English coronations in the 12th century. By the 17th century, armills were no longer delivered to the monarch, but simply carried at the coronation. For Elizabeth II's coronation in 1953, the medieval tradition was revived, and a new set of plain 22-karat gold armills lined with crimson velvet presented to the Queen on behalf of various Commonwealth governments. Each bracelet is fitted with an invisible hinge and a clasp in the form of a Tudor rose. The hallmark includes a tiny portrait of the Queen, who continued to wear the armills upon leaving the Abbey, and could be seen wearing them later, along with the Imperial State Crown and Sovereign's Ring, at her appearance on the balcony of Buckingham Palace.

Orbs

An orb, a type of globus cruciger, was first used at an English coronation by Henry VIII in 1509, and then by all subsequent monarchs apart from the early Stuart kings James I and Charles I, who opted for the medieval coronation order. The Tudor orb was deposited with St Edward's regalia at Westminster Abbey in 1625. A band of gems and pearls runs along the equator and there is a half-band on the top hemisphere. Atop the orb is an amethyst surmounted by a jewelled cross, symbolising the Christian world, with a sapphire on one side and an emerald on the other. Altogether, the orb is decorated with 375 pearls, 365 diamonds, 18 rubies, 9 emeralds, 9 sapphires, 1 amethyst and 1 piece of glass. It is handed to the sovereign during the investiture rite of the coronation, and is borne later in the left hand when leaving Westminster Abbey. A small version, originally set with hired gems, was made in 1689 for Mary II to hold at her joint coronation with William III; it was never used again at a coronation and is now set with imitation gems and cultured pearls. Both orbs were laid on Queen Victoria's coffin at her state funeral in 1901. Officially, no reason was given for using Mary II's orb, but it may have been intended to reflect Victoria's position as Empress of India.

Rings
The Sovereign's Ring has been used by all monarchs from William IV in 1831 to Elizabeth II in 1953, with the exception of Queen Victoria, whose fingers were too small to retain it. In the centre is an octagonal sapphire overlaid with a cross made of rubies. Around the sapphire are 14 brilliant diamonds. The general design is intended to represent the red St George's Cross (England) on the blue background of St Andrew's Cross (Scotland). Rubies symbolise all the kingly virtues and have featured on coronation rings since the early Middle Ages. A small copy was made for Victoria, who wrote in a letter: "The Archbishop had (most awkwardly) put the ring on the wrong finger, and the consequence was that I had the greatest difficulty to take it off again, which I at last did with great pain". Her jewellers had measured the wrong finger. In 1919, it was deposited at the Tower along with the Sovereign's Ring and Queen Consort's Ring, which all wives of kings have worn from Queen Adelaide onwards.

Before 1831, monarchs generally received a new ring symbolising their "marriage" to the nation, with perhaps two exceptions: Richard II offered Westminster Abbey a "solemn jewel, a gold ring set with a precious stone called a ruby, of no small value" to be worn by his successors. Evidence suggests it was later worn by Henry V. Another was the Stuart Coronation Ring, probably used at the English coronations of Charles I and Charles II, and certainly that of James II, who took it into exile with him in France after the Glorious Revolution in 1688. It returned to the United Kingdom 100 years later and now belongs to the Royal Collection of Gems and Jewels. The ring has a large ruby etched with a St George's Cross and bordered by 26 diamonds. Since 1830 it has been on permanent loan from Windsor Castle to Edinburgh Castle where it is displayed with the Honours of Scotland. It may be of interest to note that Mary II's coronation ring survives in the Portland Collection at Welbeck Abbey.

Sceptres

The sceptre, a symbolic ornamental rod held by the monarch at a coronation, is derived from the shepherd's staff via the crozier of a bishop. Two gold sceptres made in 1661 are part of the coronation regalia. The Sovereign's Sceptre with Cross is a token of his or her temporal power as head of state. It was part of a rough diamond weighing  found in South Africa in 1905, and was named after Thomas Cullinan, the chairman of the mining company. The gold clasps holding it can be opened and the stone removed to be worn as a pendant hanging from Cullinan II, which is set in the Imperial State Crown, to form a brooch – Queen Mary, wife of George V, often wore it like this. Above the pear-shaped diamond is the amethyst surmounted by a cross pattée encrusted with an emerald and small diamonds.

The Sovereign's Sceptre with Dove, which has also been known as the Rod of Equity and Mercy, is emblematic of their spiritual role. The sceptre is decorated with 285 gemstones, including 94 diamonds, 53 rubies, 10 emeralds, 4 sapphires and 3 spinels. Circling the rod are bands of precious stones. At the top is a gold monde set with diamonds and topped by a plain cross, upon which sits a white enamelled dove with its wings outspread, representing the Holy Ghost. A sceptre like this first appeared in the 11th century and was probably based on the German sceptre, which was topped by an Imperial Eagle. The Sceptre with Dove is the penultimate piece of regalia to be delivered. As the monarch holds both sceptres, they are crowned with St Edward's Crown.

The Crown Jewels include two sceptres made for Mary of Modena, the wife of James II, in 1685: a gold sceptre with a cross known as the Queen Consort's Sceptre with Cross, and another made of ivory topped by a dove known as the Queen Consort's Ivory Rod with Dove. Unlike the sovereign's dove, this one has folded wings and is relatively small. It was last used by Queen Elizabeth, later known as the Queen Mother, at her husband George VI's coronation in 1937. For the coronation of Mary II, the wife and joint sovereign of William III, a more elaborate gold sceptre with dove was commissioned in 1689. It has not been used since, and went missing for several decades, only to be found in 1814 at the back of a cupboard in the Tower of London.

Altar plate

In the Jewel House there is a collection of chalices, patens, flagons, candlesticks, and dishes – all silver-gilt except five gold communion vessels – that are displayed on the high altar or in front of the royal box at Westminster Abbey during coronations. Some are also used at other times. Although not regalia, such items are considered to be Crown Jewels by virtue of their long association with the Jewel House.

Around the edge are four engravings of biblical scenes: the Washing of the Feet, the Walk to Emmaus, the Coming of the Holy Ghost, and Christ's Commission to the Apostles. Made in 1664 for James, Duke of York, and later acquired by Charles II, it stands on the high altar during a coronation ceremony.

An altar dish and flagon were made in 1691 for the royal Church of St Peter ad Vincula at the Tower of London. Both pieces are still used in the chapel on Easter, Whitsun and Christmas, and they were first displayed at a coronation in 1821. Another dish still in regular use is the Maundy Dish – one of six used by the King at Royal Maundy for handing out alms to elderly people in recognition of their service to the church and local community. The ceremony, which takes place in a different cathedral every year, entirely replaced the ancient custom of washing the feet of the poor in 1730, and the dish, though it bears the royal cypher of William and Mary, dates from the reign of Charles II. Two purses containing specially minted coins are taken from the dish and presented to each recipient.

Banqueting plate

The last coronation banquet held at Westminster Hall took place in 1821 for George IV. Silverware used at those banquets include the Plymouth Fountain, a wine fountain made around 1640 by a German goldsmith and presented to Charles II by the city of Plymouth. The nautical theme is continued in the silver-gilt Wine Cistern, also known as the Grand Punch Bowl, which is cast as a giant oyster shell. It was commissioned in 1829 by George IV but not completed until after his death. It is the heaviest surviving piece of English banqueting plate. In 1841, the cistern was re-purposed as a punch bowl, with the addition of a large ivory-stemmed ladle, which has a silver-gilt bowl in the form of a nautilus shell.

It was made  1630 in Germany and is set with 73 gems probably added later. The Salt was originally bought in Hamburg in 1657 by the city's British Resident as a peace offering to the Russian court, which had cut all ties with Britain during the Interregnum. He was turned away at the Russian border and eventually took it home to London. In 1660, it was acquired from a private dealer for £700 by the city of Exeter and presented to Charles II.

Eleven smaller salts named after St George were originally made for a St George's Day banquet of the Knights of the Garter in the late 17th century. A twelfth, the Queen Elizabeth Salt, was made in 1572 during the reign of Elizabeth I for a member of the aristocracy; it was later acquired by Charles II. Twelve spoons made for George IV in 1820 complement these salts.

Baptismal plate

Three silver-gilt objects (comprising a total of six parts) associated with royal christenings are displayed in the Jewel House. Surmounting the font's domed lid is a figure of Philip the Evangelist baptising the Ethiopian eunuch. While Charles's marriage to Catherine of Braganza produced no heir, the font may have been used to secretly baptise some of his 13 illegitimate children. In 1688, James Francis Edward Stuart, son of James II and Mary of Modena, was the first royal baby to be christened using this object.

A ewer and basin of French design made in 1735 were only used at two christenings. Indeed, it was first used in 1738 at the impromptu christening of a "very ill" future George III only hours after his birth. His father, Frederick, Prince of Wales, was also banished from the royal court and forbidden to use the Charles II font. An inscription on the ewer records its presence at the 1780 christening of George III's youngest son, Prince Alfred.

The Lily Font was made in 1840 for the christening of Victoria, Princess Royal, the first child of Queen Victoria, who declined to use the Charles II font because of its unseemly history. The 1661 font was recycled as a plinth (pictured) and its basin found a new role as an altar dish. It is decorated with water lilies, symbolising purity and new life, and cherubs plucking lyres. The object has been used for the christenings of all of Elizabeth II's children and grandchildren (except Princess Eugenie) with holy water brought from the River Jordan.

Ownership, management and value
The Crown Jewels are part of the Royal Collection. As with Royal palaces, ownership is regarded as inalienable and passes from one monarch to the next in perpetuity. However, a 17th-century ruling by Sir Edward Coke, which states "the ancient jewels of the crown are heirloomes and shall descend to the next successor and are not devisable by testament", contains an exception allowing the monarch to dispose of objects via letters patent during their lifetime under the Great Seal or Privy Seal. In 1995, Iain Sproat, then Secretary of State for National Heritage, confirmed that the disposal of the Royal Collection was "entirely a matter for the Queen". Their potential value is generally not included in estimates of the monarch's wealth because in practice it is unlikely the Crown Jewels will ever be sold, nor are they insured against loss, and are officially described as priceless. Maintenance, alteration and repair falls to the Crown Jeweller, a member of the Royal Household who cleans them after visiting hours at the Tower of London each January and accompanies the regalia and plate whenever they leave the Tower for use at royal ceremonies. Older items have been conserved by experts from the British Museum. The Royal Collection Trust keeps an inventory of the jewels, and Historic Royal Palaces is responsible for their display.

See also

Notes

References

Bibliography

External links

Royal Collection Trust
The Crown Jewels at Historic Royal Palaces
The Crown Jewels at the website of the British royal family

Videos:
Royal Regalia from The Coronation (2018) with commentary by Anna Keay
The Crown Jewels (1967) by British Pathé
The Crown Jewels (1937) by British Pathé

 
United Kingdom
National symbols of the United Kingdom
Tower of London